Mason Lindahl is a guitarist and songwriter from Sacramento, California.

Prominently known for his unique fingerstyle of guitar playing. Mason has been compared guitarist and songwriters such as John Fahey, Leonard Cohen and James Blackshaw. With music released on Porter Records, Para-sight records and Lifes Blood recordings.

Discography

Albums
 Serrated Man sound (2009)
 Kissing Rosy in the Rain (2021)

Collaboration
 Harper – What's up? (content imagination) (2009)
 slow sun stops (2022) with Angel Deradoorian

Split releases
 Sacramento Split 2x7" (2010) split with Ellie Fortune, Raleigh Moncrief and Zach Hill

References

External links 
 KZSU Zookeeper Online
 MASON LINDAHL SERRATED MAN SOUND
 WIDR's Top 5 – November 11, 2009
 Mason Lindahl "Serrated Man Sound"
 mason lindahl
 Porter Records
 lifesblood
 masonlindahl.com
 

Living people
Songwriters from California
Guitarists from California
Year of birth missing (living people)